Allecula morio is a species of beetle belonging to the family Tenebrionidae.

It is native to Europe.

References

Tenebrionidae